A referendum on appointing Tomás Guardia Gutiérrez as President with special powers was held in Costa Rica on 8 August 1870. It was approved, and Gutiérrez assumed the presidency on 11 September.

Background
On 27 April 1870 Gutiérrez had been one of a group of army officers who had deposed President Jesús Jiménez Zamora. Bruno Carranza had become president, but Gutiérrez had held real power. After three months, he replaced Carranza.

Aftermath
On 15 October 1871 Gutiérrez convened a Constitutional Council, which adopted a new constitution on 7 December. It allowed for the election of a military person as President. Gutiérrez subsequently remained in office until his death in 1882.

References

1870 referendums
1870 in Costa Rica
Referendums in Costa Rica